Pretend I’m Dead is the first novel published by writer Jen Beagin. It was followed by a sequel novel titled Vacuum in the Dark.

Pretend I’m Dead was shortlisted for The Center for Fiction’s 2018 First Novel Prize.

In Kirkus Reviews, the novel received a starred review and was listed on Kirkus' Best Debut Fiction of 2018."What gives this novel its heart is Beagin’s capacity for seeing: As Mona cleans peoples’ homes, we learn that the wealthy, well-dressed, superior individuals who pay her to scrub their toilets are just as messed up as the addicts and prostitutes and gamblers she encounters outside of work. This is not a new theme, of course, but Beagin makes it fresh with her sly, funny, compassionate voice. This is a terrific debut. Singularly enjoyable."  Kirkus Review

The title was originally published as a paperback by NU Press, and has since been published in the UK with new book cover art.

Emily Books gave an early positive review of the first edition of Pretend I’m Dead, published in 2015 as a paperback by Northwestern University Press. With a new cover designed by Alex Merto, the novel was reissued as a hardcover in 2018 by Simon & Schuster.

See also

Excerpts 

"Yoko and Yoko" excerpt from Pretend I'm Dead (2016)
Excerpt from "Hole" in Pretend I'm Dead (2015)

References 

2018 American novels
Simon & Schuster books
2018 debut novels